Raniganj is a village in Gonda district of Uttar Pradesh state of India.

Located along National Highway 231, Raniganj is also a junction railway station on the Indian Railways system.

See also 

 Railway stations in India

References

Villages in Gonda district